Philip Joseph, Prince of Salm-Kyrburg (1709–1779) was the first prince of Salm-Kyrburg, from 1743 to 1779.

Life and reign
He was the second son of Hendrik Gabriel Joseph of Salm-Kyrburg, regent of Salm-Kyrburg from 1696 to 1716, and his wife Princess Maria Theresia de Croÿ. He had an elder brother, John, and a sister, Henriëtte (who married Maximilian, Prince van Hornes, who already had two daughters from a previous marriage, the eldest of whom later married Philip Joseph).

The Salm-Mörchingen family lost the titles of "Wildgrave of Dhaun" and "Rhinegrave of Stein" in 1681, when they lacked a male successor. Salm-Kyrburg was from then on run by regents on their behalf. Philip Joseph reigned with his brother John from 1716. When Salm-Kyrburg again arose, this time as a principality, Philip Joseph became its first prince.

Marriage and issue
He married in 1742 to Princess Maria Theresa van Hornes (1725-1783), who was made her father's sole heir in 1763, with his titles and country estates thus passing to the princes of Salm-Kyrburg. Emanuel's other daughter, Princess Elisabeth of Hornes, widow of Gustaaf Adolf, Prince of Stolberg-Gedern and mother of Charles Edward Stuart's wife Louise, agreed to this without protest.

Philip Joseph and Maria Theresa had 10 children, including a pair of twins:
 Marie Maximiliane Louise (1744–1790), married Jean Bretagne Charles de La Trémoille, duc de Thouars
 Frederick (1744–1794), later 2nd prince of Salm-Kyrburg
 Auguste Friederike (1747–1822), married Duke Anne Emmanuel de Croÿ
 Charles Augustus (1750)
 Marie Louise (born 1753, date of death unknown)
 Louis Joseph Ferdinand (1753–1774)
 Elisabeth Claudine (1756–1757)
 Amalie Zephyrine (1760–1841), married Anton Aloys, Prince of Hohenzollern-Sigmaringen
 Charles Albert Henry (1761)
 Maurice Gustav Adolf (1761–1813), married Countess Christiane von Wartenberg

1709 births
1779 deaths
German princes
Recipients of the Order of the White Eagle (Poland)